Carvoeiro is a town and a former civil parish in the municipality (concelho) of Lagoa, Algarve, Portugal. In 2013, the parish merged into the new parish Lagoa e Carvoeiro. The population in 2011 was 2,721, in an area of 11.66 km².

There are two beaches at Carvoeiro, including Carvoeiro Beach (Praia de Carvoeiro) and Paradise Beach (Praia do Paraíso).

History

Formed from a picturesque fishing village, with a long history of settlement, the parish slowly developed into a tourist area in the municipality of Lagoa, owing to its number of sand beaches protected by cliffs. There are vestiges of human settlement dating to the Roman occupation of the peninsula, as well as early naval activity in the area.

The region was historically unspared from frequent pirate and military assaults along the coast, with a number of naval battles occurring off the coast. Most notably, in 1544, a squadron of ships under D. Pedro da Cunha, battled the Turkish barbary coast pirate, Xarramet. From historical records, the earliest settlement originated in the name Caboiere, an old name for a hamlet of fishermen from the Islamic-medieval period. For most of its history, fishing was the mainstay of the local economy.

However, from the 1960s onward, tourism gradually became the economic base of the area, with many new hotels, apartment complexes, shops, roads, and significant improvements to infrastructures completed to attract visitors to the metropole. An insight into the effects of mass tourism on the Algarve, centred on Carvoeiro, was written by Patrick Swift, detailing the community before the arrival of mass tourism. Swift was an artist and long-time resident of Carvoeiro who founded Porches Pottery.

Carvoeiro became a separate/independent parish in 1985 and raised to the status of town on 19 April 2001.

Geography
Algar Seco, a few hundred meters along the coast east of the main square and beach, is a popular nature site where ocean wave erosion has carved out grottoes, islets and water-spouts. It is also renowned in the vicinity for prime marine life spotting. In 2011, a blue whale (Balaenoptera musculus) was sighted off the coastline by local fishermen, but more commonly, bottlenose dolphins (Tursiops aduncus) are seen in pods of up to 12.

Architecture
To the west of the town is the site of an old ruined fort, ordered built in 1670 as part of the coastal defenses of the Algarve. Only a gate survives. At the same site is the Shrine of Our Lady of the Incarnation, a chapel overlooking the sea, whose construction is said to have antedated the fort.

Civic

 Lighthouse of Alfanzina, comprising a main rectangular central block, connected by hall and lateral wings (used as residences/living quarters) and central circular tower with spiral staircase, with azulejo tile covering the interior. The design is comparable to the old lighthouse of Ponta dos Capelinhos and Ribeirinha (on the island of Faial in the Azores) or the Lighthouse of Cabo Sardão.

Military
 Fort of Our Lady of the Incarnation, little remains of the fortress, but the eastern wall, where the hermitage of Nossa Senhora da Encarnação and the older buildings of the Fiscal Guard. The fort was constructed in 1670 under the direction of Governor of Algarve, D. Nuno de Mendonça, Count of Val dos Reis, but began to serve as a fiscal outpost after 1870, before becoming a cultural attraction in the middle of the 20th century.

See also 
 Marinha Beach
 Lagoa, Algarve

References

External links

Seaside resorts in Portugal
Villages in the Algarve
Former parishes of Portugal
Parishes of Lagoa, Algarve